Bruno Lesaffre (born 11 March 1962) is a French freestyle swimmer. He competed in the men's 4 × 100 metre freestyle relay at the 1984 Summer Olympics.

References

External links
 

1962 births
Living people
Olympic swimmers of France
Swimmers at the 1984 Summer Olympics
Place of birth missing (living people)
French male freestyle swimmers